The Harlem Community Art Center was a Federal Art Project community art center that operated from 1937 to 1942. It influenced various budding artists intent on depicting Harlem and led to the formation of the Harlem Arts Alliance. It became a countrywide exemplar for others, notably the South Side Community Art Center in Chicago.

History 

Augusta Savage led various art classes in Harlem, and several other art leaders collaborated with the 135th Street Branch of the New York Public Library in establishing community workshops. The Harlem YMCA also held art classes between 1934 and 1935 led by sculptor William Artis.

The idea for the Harlem Community Art Center came from African-American artists in the Harlem Artists Guild. They envisioned a community space free to all, making art instruction accessible. The Harlem Community Art Center was based on the ideal that art was central to community, and aspired to be both a space for exposing people to art and an institution for developing African-American artists.

The Harlem Community Art Center was a WPA-sponsored center in operation from November 1937 to 1942.  The center was first directed by Augusta Savage, and Gwendolyn Bennett assumed the role afterward. It is widely considered a focal arena for the Harlem Renaissance.

Significance 

In its first 16 months, 70,592 people attended Harlem Community Art Center activities and more than 1,500 took part in day or evening classes in drawing, painting, sculpture, printmaking, and design. Artists who taught or studied at the center include Charles Alston, Henry Bannarn, Romare Bearden, Selma Burke, Ernest Crichlow, Aaron Douglas, Elton Fax, Sargent Johnson, William Henry Johnson, Langston Hughes, Ronald Joseph, Robert Blackburn, Jacob Lawrence, Norman Lewis, Claude McKay, James Lesene Wells and Richard Wright.

The center also had the chance to influence more than just adults: "And who are these people who have been reached by the Center? Exactly 2,467 children and adults have registered in the art classes. More than 23,989 people have participated in the Center's extension activities, lectures, and demonstrations. Thousands of others come to the Center regularly to see the exhibitions and to attend other special events". Psychiatric wards would send children with mental illnesses to the center and they flourished.

The Harlem Community Art Center had a multiethnic faculty and a diverse student population was also diverse. Students ranged from established Harlem artists to children from New York psychiatric hospitals who benefitted from creative activities.

Further reading

"WPA art comes to Harlem." Architectural Forum 68 (February 1938 supplement): 8. Account of the opening of the Harlem Community Art Center including photographs of those attending the opening: Augusta Savage (artist); Asa Philip Randolph (labor leader); Holger Cahill, and James Weldon Johnson (poet). 
Randolph, A. Philip. "Harlem's art center." Art Digest 12 (January 1, 1938): 15. pp. 115–116, The New Deal Fine Arts Projects. Harlem Community Art Center (270 Lenox Avenue) sponsored by the FAP and the Harlem Citizen's Sponsoring Committee opened December 20, 1937. Includes the text of the comments by A. Philip Randolph, president of the Brotherhood of Sleeping Car Porters and chairman of the Harlem Citizen's Sponsoring Committee. 
Federal Art Project. Exhibition of Negro cultural work on the Federal Art Projects of New York City Art-Music-Writers-Theatre-Historical Records. FAP: New York, 1939. 4 p. Mimeographed. Exhibition, February 10–24, 1939. Exhibition held at the Harlem Community Art Center of work by all branches of the WPA's Federal One. Includes work from the FAP's painting and sculpture divisions and by children taught in the art teaching division. Found in AAA reel 1085. 153–156.
Dows, Owen. "Art for housing tenants". Magazine of Art 31 (November 1938): 616–23, 662. Excellent account of the use of FAP work in Harlem tenements. Numerous b/w illustrations of the work (many works of sculpture); feels the tenements project is a good idea and needs to be expanded.
"Cultural front." Direction 1 (November–December 1938): 28. Note on a benefit dance to support the Harlem Art Center to be held November 12, 1938; note on the "Four Unit Exhibition" being held at the Federal Art Gallery (NYC) 
"Harlem goes to Chicago." Art Digest 12 (August 1, 1938): 6. Note on the exhibition of 40 works done by children and adults at the Harlem Community Art Center at the Chicago YWCA through August 20, 1938. 
"Black art: paintings by Negroes." Direction 1 (April 1938): 16-17. Praise for the creation of the Harlem Art Center; mostly illustrations. B/W photographs of work by Vertis Hayes, Henry Holmes, and Palmer Hayden. 
Federal Art Project. New York City. Federal Art Centers of New York. FAP: New York, 1937? 8 pp. A brief overview of art in America and the functions of the FAP. Brief description of what the FAP art centers do, particularly in New York City. Brief descriptions of the four art centers in New York: Contemporary Art Center; Brooklyn Community Art Center; Harlem Community Art Center; and the Queensboro Community Art Center. Found in AAA Reel 1085.19-27.
"MAAP | Mapping the African American Past." MAAP. N.p., n.d. Web. 27 May 2016.
"Creative Space: Fifty Years of Robert Blackburn's Printmaking Workshop Milieu: The Harlem Community Art Center and the WPA." Milieu: The Harlem Community Art Center and the WPA. N.p., n.d. Web. 27 May 2016.

References

External links

Harlem
Harlem Renaissance
Federal Art Project
Works Progress Administration in New York City
Community centres
Arts centers in New York City